The Light That Failed is a 1923 American silent drama film that was directed by George Melford and written by Jack Cunningham and F. McGrew Willis based on the 1891 novelette of the same name by Rudyard Kipling. The film stars Jacqueline Logan, Percy Marmont, David Torrence, Sigrid Holmquist, Mabel Van Buren, Luke Cosgrave, and Peggy Schaffer. The film was released on October 25, 1923, by Paramount Pictures.

It was remade in 1939 as a sound film The Light That Failed starring Ronald Colman.

Plot
As described in a film magazine review, artist Dick Heldar returns to London from the Sudan and wins fame through his war sketches. He meets his old sweetheart, Maisie Wells. Bessie Broke, the model for his masterpiece painting, causes a quarrel between the lovers. Dick goes blind and Bessie destroys the painting, which Dick had worked on during his last moments of sight. Later, Bessie relents and brings the two lovers back together again just as Dick's friend Topenhow leaves for the front during World War I.

Cast

Preservation
With no prints of The Light That Failed located in any film archives, it is a lost film.

References

External links

Still at silentfilmstillarchive.com
Still at silenthollywood.com

1923 films
Famous Players-Lasky films
Silent American drama films
1923 drama films
Paramount Pictures films
Films directed by George Melford
Films based on British novels
Films based on works by Rudyard Kipling
American black-and-white films
American silent feature films
Films set in London
1920s American films